XHRLA-FM is a radio station on 95.7 FM in Santa Rosalía, Baja California Sur. The station is branded as Radio La Giganta.

History
XERLA-AM 930, later 940, received its concession on May 8, 1995. It was a 1 kW daytimer.

XERLA was authorized to move to FM in 2011.

References

Radio stations in Baja California Sur
Radio stations established in 1996
Radio stations in Mexico with continuity obligations